Julie Corletto (née Prendergast; born 10 October 1986) is an Australian international netball player. She played for the Australian Diamonds and NSW Swifts but has now retired. She usually played in the positions of goal defence and wing defence.  Corletto is the younger sister of former AFL footballer Ian Prendergast.

Career
Corletto started playing netball at aged 10 in her home town of Kerang. She made her Commonwealth Bank Trophy debut at the age of 16 for the Melbourne Phoenix, where her style of defence saw her named Netball Australia's best new talent. She was selected in the Australian open squad at the age of 17. In 2005 she captained the Australian U-21 team to a bronze medal at the World Youth Championships, while on the comeback trail from a stress fracture in her foot.

In 2007 Corletto was recruited from the Melbourne Phoenix to cross-town rivals, Melbourne Kestrels. Also that year, she was named in the Australian national team to tour England in a tri-series. However, after injuring her ankle in the first minutes of the season opener, the local derby between Phoenix and Kestrels, she was forced to pull out, with Melbourne Kestrels teammate Rebecca Bulley called up in her place. But a few months later Corletto went on to make a debut for Australia against Jamaica, and played goal defence during a subsequent Australian series win against New Zealand. In November 2007, she won her first ever world championship title, as the youngest member of the victorious Australian team.

In 2008 Corletto signed with the Melbourne Vixens to play in the new trans-Tasman ANZ Championship. She again played for the Vixens in the 2009 (and married Melbourne Tigers basketballer Daryl Corletto). She capped off the 2009 season with the ANZ Championship premiership-winning Vixens, coming runner-up in the Vixens' Best & Fairest, and being awarded the Liz Ellis Diamond, the highest and most prestigious individual honour in Australian netball, awarded to the player that has polled the most votes across the ANZ Championship and Australian Diamonds seasons. Corletto's 2010 season was interrupted with her having to undergo knee surgery on both knees, thus missing out in representing Australia in the Commonwealth Games.

Corletto made up for her misfortunes in 2011, returning to the Vixens team during round 5 of the 2011 season, and being named in the Diamonds Squad to represent Australia in the World Netball Championships. At the end of the 2012 ANZ championship season, she announced she was leaving the Vixens to sign with the New Zealand team the Northern Mystics in 2013 to join husband Daryl, who had re-signed with the New Zealand Breakers. She played for the Northern Mystics in 2013 and 2014.  Corletto played in the Australian Netball Diamonds 2014 Commonwealth Games team that won the gold medal.

In 2015, Corletto was part of the New South Wales Swifts team that lost in the ANZ Championship finals to the Queensland Firebirds. She also won the gold medal playing for the Diamonds at 2015 Netball World Cup, playing with injured knees and a broken foot. Corletto subsequently announced her retirement from international netball after the tournament.

ANZ Championship accolades
 2011 Melbourne Vixens Coaches Award

Netball career facts
 2015 World Championship gold medal
 2014 Australian Commonwealth Games Netball Team
 2011 World Championship gold medal (extra-time)
 2009 Liz Ellis Diamond winner
 2009 ANZ Championship victory with Melbourne Vixens
 2007 World Championship gold medal
 2005 Commonwealth Bank Trophy winner with Melbourne Phoenix
 2004 Commonwealth Bank Trophy Best New Talent

Personal life
Julie is married to basketballer Daryl Corletto. The two have a son, born in 2016 and a daughter born in 2018

References

External links
 2009 Melbourne Vixens profile. Retrieved on 2009-03-27.

1986 births
Living people
Melbourne Vixens players
Melbourne Kestrels players
Melbourne Phoenix players
New South Wales Swifts players
Northern Mystics players
Commonwealth Games gold medallists for Australia
Netball players at the 2014 Commonwealth Games
Commonwealth Games medallists in netball
People from Kerang
Australia international netball players
Victorian Netball League players
Netball players from Victoria (Australia)
Australian expatriate netball people in New Zealand
2007 World Netball Championships players
2011 World Netball Championships players
2015 Netball World Cup players
Medallists at the 2014 Commonwealth Games